David Kamo  (born August 4, 1986, in Boise, Idaho) is an American professional motorcycle enduro racer. He races for the Factory KTM Off Road Team. He is currently competing on a KTM 450XC-F in the American Motorcyclist Association National Hare and Hound series, Best In The Desert (BITD) series, International Six Days Enduro (ISDE), World Enduro Championship (WEC) and Western Hare Scrambles series.

Personal life
Kamo is an only child born to Curt and Kathleen "Kit" Kamo. He graduated from New Plymouth High School in New Plymouth, Idaho and attended Treasure Valley Community College, receiving certification in many types of welding. David currently lives in Caldwell, Idaho.

Achievements
2013 SCORE Pro Motorcycle Champion, JCR Honda 
2012 SCORE Pro Motorcycle Champion, JCR Honda
2009 A.M.A. National Hare and Hound, 3rd Overall
2009 BITD TSCO "Vegas to Reno" The Long Way! 1st Overall 
2008 A.M.A. National Hare and Hound, 2nd Overall 
2007 A.M.A. National Hare and Hound, 4th Overall
2005 Red Bull Last Man Standing, 8th Overall

Future
Kamo is currently racing the AMA National Hare and Hound Series in the Pro Class. He is also expanding on his Mountain Bike Racing this summer, racing his first 7-day stage race The BC Bike Race in Canada, Summer 2015.

Career

2010

2009

Sponsors
PCI Race Radios PCI Race Radios
TBT Racing TBT Racing
SIDI Boots SIDI Boots
Moose Racing
6D Helmets
KTM North America KTM North America
Dragon
Noguchi
Del Amo Motorsports
Mark Kariya - Photographer

References

External links
 DAVIDKAMO.COM
 KTM USA

1986 births
Living people
American motorcycle racers
Off-road motorcycle racers
Enduro riders
People from Caldwell, Idaho
Sportspeople from Boise, Idaho